Anguilla breviceps is a species of eels in the family Anguillidae. It was described by Y.T. Chu and Jin in 1984. It is a subtropical eel found in freshwater bodies in China.

References

Anguillidae
Fish described in 1984